Robert Anderson Huebel (born June 4, 1969) is an American actor, comedian and writer best known for his sketch comedy work on the MTV series Human Giant and for his role of Dr. Owen Maestro on the Adult Swim series Childrens Hospital. He also appeared as Russell on the FX/FXX series The League and as Len Novak on the Amazon Prime Video series Transparent. In December 2022, Entertainment Weekly called Huebel "the premier d-bag character actor of his generation".

Early life
Huebel was born in Alexandria, Virginia, the son of Louisa and Jared Huebel. He attended Annandale High School in Annandale, Virginia, before attending Clemson University, where he studied marketing in hopes of working in advertising. He later moved to New York and began studying improv comedy at the Upright Citizens Brigade Theater.

Career

Huebel first began improvising when he was 27 by taking classes at the Upright Citizens Brigade Theatre in New York City.

His early work was as a sketch actor on shows such as  Late Night with Conan O'Brien and Upright Citizens Brigade. He was nominated for an Emmy award for his work as a producer for Michael Moore's Bravo series The Awful Truth. He worked as a segment producer on The Daily Show with Jon Stewart.

Huebel was a panelist on the VH1 series Best Week Ever, part of the NetZero "Candidate Zero" campaign during the 2004 election. He also appeared on the HBO television series Curb Your Enthusiasm and Fox's Arrested Development.

The comedy partner of Rob Riggle, the duo have worked with the improvisational comedy troupe Respecto Montalban and at the Upright Citizens Brigade. Huebel and Riggle performed a comedy bit in the documentary Super High Me. Among their best known work at UCB was their long-running two-man show Kung-Fu Grip, which was eventually showcased at the 2004 HBO Comedy Arts Festival. Huebel was in the movie Blackballed: The Bobby Dukes Story, as Sam Brown with Corddry, Scheer, and Riggle.

Huebel and fellow comedians Aziz Ansari and Paul Scheer are writers, actors, and executive producers in the MTV sketch comedy show Human Giant. Some of Huebel's characters from the show include Samir from "The Shutterbugs" and T.C. Everwood from "Clell Tickle". He guest starred in the 30 Rock episode "MILF Island", and also as Holly's boyfriend A.J. in three episodes of The Office. He played the role of Tevin in the 2009 comedy I Love You, Man. He also co-starred with Rob Corddry in Childrens Hospital.

Huebel continues to regularly perform at the Upright Citizens Brigade Theatre in Los Angeles. He co-hosts the live sketch show "Crash Test" with Paul Scheer twice a month, as well as hosting "The Shit Show", in which he gathers comedian friends and other well-known performers to present the worst scenes in films, television and commercials that they have ever done.

Huebel has written and starred in various filmed sketches for the HBO sketch comedy program Funny or Die Presents. In November 2010, he performed stand-up on The Benson Interruption on Comedy Central.

Huebel appeared in the films The Other Guys (2010), Life as We Know It, Little Fockers, Despicable Me, and The Descendants. In February 2011, he was cast as a lead in the Fox sitcom pilot Family Album and in May he guest starred on ABC's sitcom Modern Family as Glen Whipple in the episode "The One That Got Away". He also appeared in a recurring role on Amazon Studios's Transparent, playing Len Novak.

Huebel appears frequently on the comedy podcast Comedy Bang! Bang! along with starring in his own podcast series on the Earwolf network, Mike Detective. He later appeared in Horrible Bosses 2 (2014) and Barely Lethal (2015).

Huebel has starred as "Inconsiderate Cell-Phone Man" in several PSAs of this title, which are shown in movie theaters to discourage patrons from making calls during the picture.

Personal life
Huebel is married to Holly Hannula. Their daughter, Holden, was born in 2016. She was born premature at 26 weeks and spent the first 117 days of her life in the Neonatal Intensive Care Unit.

Filmography

Film

Television

Web series

References

External links

Official website

Rob Huebel on Twitter

1969 births
American male comedians
American male film actors
American male television actors
American male voice actors
American sketch comedians
American television producers
American television writers
American male television writers
Clemson University alumni
Living people
Male actors from Alexandria, Virginia
People from Columbia, South Carolina
20th-century American male actors
21st-century American male actors
Upright Citizens Brigade Theater performers
Screenwriters from Virginia
Screenwriters from South Carolina
20th-century American comedians
21st-century American comedians
Annandale High School alumni